Honker or Honkers can refer to:

Anatomical features
 A nose
 Breasts

The arts
 Honkers (Sesame Street), characters in the children's show
 Canada goose, sometimes referred to by the slang term "honker"

Engineering and technology
 Tarpan Honker, a Polish all-terrain vehicle
 Vehicle horn

Groups
 Honker Union, a Chinese activist group 
 Rochester Honkers, an amateur baseball team in Minnesota, US

Locations
 Hong Kong, sometimes referred to by the Australian or Oxford slang term "Honkers"

pt:Darkwing Duck#Personagens